Stenalia australis is a beetle in the genus Stenalia of the family Mordellidae. It was first described in 1956.

References

australis
Beetles described in 1956